The Gomelsky Cup is an annual basketball tournament held in Moscow in the fall. Four European teams are selected to participate in the tournament. The four teams face off in the semifinal bracket; the two winners of each match play each other, while the losers also play each other for third place. The hosts CSKA Moscow have won seven consecutive titles since 2010 till 2016, and in 2018-2020 and it is the current champion.

The tournament is named after CSKA's legendary basketball coach, Alexander Gomelsky.

Tournaments

2008

2009

2010

2011

2012

2013

2014

2015

2016

2017

2018

2019

2020

Medal count

Notes

References

 
Basketball cup competitions in Europe
International basketball competitions hosted by Russia
Recurring sporting events established in 2008
2008 establishments in Russia